Brian Bedford (16 February 1935 – 13 January 2016) was an English actor. He appeared in film and on stage, and was an actor-director of Shakespeare productions. Bedford was nominated for seven Tony Awards for his theatrical work. 

He served as the voice of Disney's Robin Hood from the 1973 animated film of the same name.

Early life
Brian Bedford was born in Morley, West Yorkshire on 16 February 1935, the son of Ellen (née O'Donnell) and Arthur Bedford, a postman. He attended St Bede's Grammar School in Bradford, leaving at the age of 15. He attended the Royal Academy of Dramatic Art in London from 1952 to 1955. At RADA, he was in the same class as Albert Finney, Alan Bates and Peter O'Toole.

Career
Primarily a stage actor, he appeared in English-speaking interpretations of the French playwright Molière, including Tony Award nominated performances in Tartuffe, The Molière Comedies (a double bill of the short plays The School for Husbands and The Imaginary Cuckold) and The School for Wives, for which he received the Tony Award for Best Performance by a Leading Actor in a Play.

He performed Shakespearean work, such as Ariel in The Tempest opposite John Gielgud's Prospero in 1958, and at the Stratford Festival in Ontario, Canada including Angelo in Measure for Measure, Malvolio in Twelfth Night and the title role in Richard III directed by Robin Phillips, and The Public Theater's New York Shakespeare Festival Shakespeare in the Park productions of As You Like It (as Jacques), and Timon of Athens (as Timon) on Broadway, with the National Actors Theatre in 1993. Bedford's additional Broadway credits include The Seven Descents of Myrtle, Private Lives, Two Shakespearean Actors, London Assurance and Jumpers.

Bedford appeared with James Garner in the 1966 film Grand Prix, and in 1967 he was a regular on the CBS series Coronet Blue. He provided the voice of the title character in the 1973 Disney film Robin Hood, which director Byron Howard credits as a major inspiration for the Academy Award-winning animated film, Zootopia. In 1988, he appeared as Mr. Stone, the head of the consortium that owns Cheers, and would later appear (as a different character) in its spin-off, Frasier, in 2000. In 1997 Bedford was inducted into the American Theater Hall of Fame. Other honours include the Obie Award, the Outer Circle Critics Award, the Drama Desk Award, and the L.A. Drama Critics Award.

In 2009, Bedford starred as Lady Bracknell in The Importance of Being Earnest, marking 27 seasons of acting and/or directing, at the Stratford Festival in Canada.

He repeated the role in 2010 (in a double role as both actor and director) for the Roundabout Theatre in New York, which earned him a 2011 Tony Award nomination for Best Performance by a Leading Actor in a Play.

Personal life
Bedford shared homes in Stratford, Ontario and in Santa Barbara, California with fellow actor Tim MacDonald, his partner after 1985 and husband from 2013.

Death
Bedford died from cancer on 13 January 2016 in Santa Barbara, California, at the age of 80; his remains were cremated.

Stratford Shakespeare Festival

Actor

 Twelfth Night (1975) by William Shakespeare  — Malvolio
 Measure for Measure (1975) by William Shakespeare  — Angelo
 Richard III (1977) by William Shakespeare — Richard III
 The Guardsman (1977) by Ferenc Molnár — The Actor
 As You Like It (1977,1978) by William Shakespeare — Jacques
 Private Lives (1978) by Noël Coward — Elyot
 The Winter's Tale (1978) by William Shakespeare — Leontes
 Uncle Vanya (1978) by Anton Chekhov — Dr Astrov
 Much Ado About Nothing (1980) by William Shakespeare — Benedick
 Twelfth Night (1980) by William Shakespeare — Malvolio
 The Seagull (1980) by Anton Chekhov  — Trigorin
 The Misanthrope (1981) by Molière — Alceste
 Arms and the Man (1982) by George Bernard Shaw — Bluntschli
 Blithe Spirit (1982) by Noël Coward  — Charles
 Richard II (1983) by William Shakespeare — Richard II
 Tartuffe (1983, 1984) by Molière  — Tartuffe
 A Midsummer Night's Dream (1984) by William Shakespeare — Bottom
 Waiting for Godot (1984) by Samuel Beckett — Vladimir
 The Relapse (1989) by John Vanbrugh — Lord Foppington
 The Merchant of Venice (1989) by William Shakespeare — Shylock
 The Lunatic, the Lover & the Poet (1989) by Brian Bedford — adapted Shakespeare texts
 Macbeth (1990) by William Shakespeare — Macbeth
 Julius Caesar (1990) by William Shakespeare — Brutus
 The Lunatic, the Lover & the Poet (1990) by Brian Bedford — adapted Shakespeare texts
 Timon of Athens (1991) by William Shakespeare — Timon
 Much Ado About Nothing (1991) by William Shakespeare — Dogberry
 The School for Wives (1991) by Molière  — Arnolphe
 Measure for Measure (1992) by William Shakespeare — Duke
 Twelfth Night (1994) by William Shakespeare — Feste
 The School for Husbands & The Imaginary Cuckold (1994) by Molière  — Sganarelle
 Amadeus (1995, 1996) by Peter Shaffer — Salieri
 The Little Foxes (1996) by Lillian Hellman — Horace
 Equus (1997) by Peter Shaffer  — Dysart
 Much Ado About Nothing (1998) by William Shakespeare — Benedick
 A Midsummer Night's Dream (1999) by William Shakespeare — Bottom
 The School for Scandal (1999) by Richard Brinsley Sheridan — Sir Peter Teazle
 Tartuffe (2000) by Molière  — Tartuffe
 Private Lives (2001) by Noël Coward  — Elyot
 The Seagull (2001) by Anton Chekhov  — Sorin
 The Lunatic, the Lover & the Poet (2002) by Brian Bedford — adapted Shakespeare texts
 Present Laughter (2003) by Noël Coward  — Garry Essendine
 Love's Labour's Lost (2003) by William Shakespeare — Don Armado 
 London Assurance (2006) by Dion Boucicault — Sir Harcourt Courtly
 Twelfth Night (2006) by William Shakespeare — Malvolio
 King Lear (2007) by William Shakespeare — King Lear
 The Importance of Being Earnest (2009) by Oscar Wilde — Lady Bracknell

Director
 Titus Andronicus (1978, 1980) by William Shakespeare
 Coriolanus (1981) by William Shakespeare
 The Rivals (1981) by Richard Brinsley Sheridan
 Blithe Spirit (1982) by Noël Coward
 The Lunatic, the Lover & the Poet (1989, 1990, 2002) by Brian Bedford
 Phaedra (1990) by Racine
 Othello (1994) by William Shakespeare
 Waiting for Godot (1996, 1998) by Samuel Beckett
 Equus (1997) by Peter Shaffer
 The Winter's Tale (1998) by William Shakespeare
 Private Lives (2001) by Noël Coward
 Present Laughter (2003) by Noël Coward
 Noises Off (2004) by Michael Frayn 
 Fallen Angels (2005) by Noël Coward
 London Assurance (2006) by Dion Boucicault
 King Lear (2007) by William Shakespeare
 The Importance of Being Earnest (2009) by Oscar Wilde
 Blithe Spirit (2013) by Noël Coward

Filmography

Film

Television

Awards and nominations
Tony Awards
1971 Best Leading Actor in Play – The School for Wives (winner)
1992 Best Leading Actor in Play – Two Shakespearean Actors (nominee)
1994 Best Leading Actor in Play – Timon of Athens (nominee)
1995 Best Leading Actor in Play – The Molière Comedies (nominee)
1997 Best Leading Actor in Play – London Assurance (nominee)
2003 Best Leading Actor in Play – Tartuffe (nominee)
2011 Best Leading Actor in Play – The Importance of Being Earnest (nominee)

Drama Desk Awards
1969 Outstanding Performance – The Misanthrope (winner)
1970 Outstanding Performance – Private Lives (winner)
1971 Outstanding Performance – The School for Wives (winner)
1974 Outstanding Performance – Jumpers (winner)
1992 Outstanding Actor in a Play – Two Shakespearean Actors (winner)
1994 Outstanding Actor in a Play – Timon of Athens (nominee)
2011 Outstanding Featured Actor in a Play – The Importance of Being Earnest (winner)

Obie Awards 
 1965 Outstanding Performance – The Knack (winner)

References

External links

Canadian Theatre Encyclopedia entry

1935 births
2016 deaths
20th-century English male actors
21st-century English male actors
Alumni of RADA
British expatriate male actors in the United States
Deaths from cancer in California
Drama Desk Award winners
English expatriates in Canada
English expatriates in the United States
English male film actors
English male Shakespearean actors
English male stage actors
English male television actors
English male voice actors
English people of Irish descent
English gay actors
English LGBT actors
LGBT theatre directors
Male actors from Yorkshire
People from Morley, West Yorkshire
Tony Award winners
20th-century English LGBT people
21st-century English LGBT people
People educated at St. Bede's Grammar School